Kaki Kitai is a Malaysian Malay-language action comedy film. For the film MiG pictures featured actors Shaheizy Sam, Fezrul Khan, Farid Kamil, Adam Corrie, Along Eyzendy, and Epy Kodiang, Emily Chan as well as Zalif Sidek and Faith Zakie.

Synopsis
Tell about 2 Grenggo / Din friends (Shaheizy Sam) & Ayoi (Fezrul Khan) who are less astute coming from the village and trying to act smartly. Din is also 3 years living in Kuala Lumpur. The story begins when Din welcomes Ayoi who just arrived from the village at the bus station. They unintentionally interrupted the operation of the policemen who were on duty and had provoked the Detective Inspector Farid (Farid Kamil). Farid's coincidence is a good friend of Din & Ayoi while in school. There were only those who had been disturbed by the work of Detective Inspector Farid until he was reprimanded by the superior.

Cast
 Shaheizy Sam as Din/Grenggo
 Fezrul Khan as Ayoi
 Farid Kamil as Detective Inspector Farid
 Epy Kodiang as Corporal Aepul
 Emily Chan as Mimi
 Along Eyzendy as Murad
 Adam Corrie as Brenggo
 Mohd Noor Bon as Dato' Jamal
 Mandy Chong as Datin Salmah
 Riezman Khuzaimi as Chief of police
 Zalif Sidek as Zaki
 Faith Zakie as Shiela

References

External links
 

2014 films
2014 action comedy films
Malaysian action comedy films